Zero Hour is a documentary-style television series. It aired on History Television in Canada, on the BBC in the United Kingdom, and on The History Channel in the United States. Zero Hour has also aired on Channel Seven in Australia (third series aired on Network Ten from 1 May 2010 and now plays on 7mate); on Discovery Channel in Africa, Asia, New Zealand, Brazil, and the Netherlands. The program focuses on retelling the details of tragic man-made disasters which each unfolded in less than an hour.

Three narrators were used over the three seasons, David Morrissey, Paul McGann and Sean Pertwee.

Certain episodes have been partially censored for particular broadcasts. One example is the Columbine High School massacre episode, which had some scenes cut (for intense violence, profanity, and racist slurs) when broadcast on Discovery Channel.

From 1 September 2014 to 1 March 2016, all episodes were available for streaming on Netflix. They can still be viewed on Amazon Video and Tubi.

In 2008, a DVD box set containing 10 episodes was released by Discovery Channel and Go Entertain. The DVDs were also released separately. The episodes included were: "Disaster at Chernobyl", "Massacre at Columbine High" (cut version), "Terror in Tokyo & The Bali Bombing", "The Capture of Saddam Hussein", "The King of Cocaine", "The Sinking of the Estonia", "The Columbia Space Shuttle Disaster", "A Royal Massacre", and "SAS Mission Impossible". "The Last Hour of Flight 11" was released on a separate DVD. All other episodes have not been released on DVD.

Episodes

Season 1 (2004)

Season 2 (2005)

Season 3 (2006)

See also

Mayday (also known as Air Crash Investigation or Air Emergency)
Seconds from Disaster
Seismic Seconds
Blueprint for Disaster
Trapped
Critical Situation (also known as Situation Critical)
Days That Shook The World (a similar British documentary series in which historical events are dramatically reconstructed)
 Crimes That Shook Britain

References

External links
Zero Hour by Cineflix Productions

History (American TV channel) original programming
BBC television documentaries
2000s Canadian documentary television series
2000s British drama television series
2004 British television series debuts
2006 British television series endings
2000s Canadian drama television series
2004 Canadian television series debuts
2006 Canadian television series endings
History (Canadian TV network) original programming
Works about the Columbine High School massacre